Jean-François Petitpied (born 18 December 1941) is a French former sports shooter. He competed at the 1976 Summer Olympics.

References

1941 births
Living people
French male sport shooters
Olympic shooters of France
Shooters at the 1976 Summer Olympics
Place of birth missing (living people)